Harveyville is a populated place situated in Huntington Township in Luzerne County, Pennsylvania. It is one of two locales in Pennsylvania with the name Harveyville, the other being located in Chester County.

References

Townships in Luzerne County, Pennsylvania